Ableukhov (masculine) or Ableukhova (feminine) is a Russian last name. Variants of this last name include Oblaukhov/Oblaukhova (/) and Obleukhov/Obleukhova (/).

It derives from a patronymic which itself is derived from the nicknames "" (Oblaukh) and "" (Oblaukhy)—alternatively spelled "" (Ableukh) and "" (Obleukhy)—meaning someone with round, plump ears.

Fictional characters
Apollon Ableukhov and Nikolay Ableukhov, characters from Petersburg, a novel by Andrey Bely

References

Notes

Sources
И. М. Ганжина (I. M. Ganzhina). "Словарь современных русских фамилий" (Dictionary of Modern Russian Last Names). Москва, 2001. 

Russian-language surnames
